The Pleasure Craft Operator Card (PCOC) is a document used in Canada as proof of competency to operate a recreational boat with a motor. It is required for any craft fitted with a motor, even if the motor is not in use, for example an auxiliary motor on a sailboat.

It has been required since 1999. Regulations are currently defined under Canadian maritime law by the Canada Shipping Act, 2001.

It is not required for non-powered pleasure craft. It is not required in Nunavut and Northwest Territories. Nor is it required by certain indigenous peoples in Canada and non-residents.

The PCOC can be obtained by taking a Transport Canada accredited boating safety course, then passing a test. Transport Canada requires a minimum study time of 3 hours for the boating safety course. The boating course is generally split up into 5 chapters with a 10 question multiple choice quiz at the end of each chapter. Curriculum includes:
 nautical terms
 safety equipment and procedures
 Canadian buoys and markers
 sharing the waterways
 rules and regulations
 emergencies
 safe boat operation
 navigation
 emergency preparedness
 fueling safety
 craft loading
 craft inspection

References

External links
 Canada Shipping Act, 2001: An act respecting shipping and navigation in Canada.

Water transport in Canada
Licenses
Transport Canada